Strangways is a surname, and may refer to:

 A. H. Fox Strangways (Arthur Henry Fox Strangways 1859–1948), a music critic who wrote for The Observer
 Henry Strangways (Henry Bull Templar Strangways 1832–1920), aka H.B.T Strangways, lawyer, politician and Premier of South Australia
 Henry Strangways (pirate) (died 1562) aka Henry Strangwish
 Thomas Bewes Strangways (1809-1859) South Australian founding settler and explorer
 Fox-Strangways, surname

See also
 Strangways, Wiltshire, a suburb of Larkhill, Wiltshire, England
 Strangways, Victoria, a locality in the Shire of Mount Alexander, Australia
 Strangways crater or Strangways River, Northern Territory, Australia
 Strange Ways (disambiguation), also for Strangeways